Head Down is one of the highest points in the county of Hampshire, England, and in the South Downs, rising to  above sea level.

The tree-covered Head Down rises about 1 kilometre south of the village of Buriton in Hampshire. It lies within the eastern part of the Queen Elizabeth Country Park and is described as "an area that caters for clubs that require land with privacy for outdoor recreational activities, such as archery or off-road vehicles."

References 

Hills of Hampshire